The Ursuline Convent was founded in 1894 by nuns of the order of St. Ursula.

The Convent Schools, as they are collectively known, offer Primary education for boys and girls aged 3 to 11, and Secondary education for girls aged 11 to 17.

St. Angela's is the Infant and Junior School, and St. Ursula's is the Senior School.

The School is located in a commercial area in the Bridgetown suburb of Collymore Rock, where fine examples of early colonial-style architecture can be seen today.

As a result of various challenges, such as dwindling enrollment and the COVID-19 pandemic, the school will close in August 2023.

References

External links

Schools in Barbados
Saint Michael, Barbados
Educational institutions established in 1894
Religious organizations established in 1894
1894 establishments in the British Empire